Gebhard Moltke (20 February 1764 – 20 December 1851) was a Danish nobleman and civil servant. He was born in Copenhagen, a son of landowner Adam Gottlob, Count Moltke to Bregentved. He moved to Funen in 1809, where he had large land properties. He inherited the estate Moltkenborg from his mother, and later bought the neighbour estate Mullerup. He was a chamberlain from 1784, and was decorated Knight of the Order of the Dannebrog, and of the Order of the Elephant.

References

1764 births
1851 deaths
People from Copenhagen
18th-century Danish nobility
19th-century Danish nobility
Danish civil servants
Knights of the Order of the Dannebrog
19th-century Danish landowners
Moltke family